Fabio Mamerto Rivas Santos (11 May 1932 – 11 August 2018) was a Dominican Roman Catholic prelate.

Born in Cabirmota, La Vega, Rivas Santos was ordained to the priesthood in 1965. He served as the Bishop of Barahona from 1976 until his resignation in 1999. He died on 11 August 2018 in Jarabacoa, at the age of 86.

References

External links

 Fabio Mamerto Rivas Santos at Catholic-Hierarchy.org

1932 births
2018 deaths
20th-century Roman Catholic bishops in the Dominican Republic
People from La Vega Province
Roman Catholic bishops of Barahona
Dominican Republic Roman Catholic bishops
White Dominicans